Placas is a municipality in the state of Pará in the Northern region of Brazil.

The municipality holds part of the Tapajós National Forest, a  sustainable use conservation unit created in 1974.

See also
List of municipalities in Pará

References

Municipalities in Pará